John Charlton Fisher, Esq., L.L.D. (October 23, 1794 – August 10, 1849) was a Canadian author, journalist, and publisher.

Born in England, he settled in Lower Canada (present-day Quebec).  He wrote the verse on the Wolfe-Montcalm Monument.

External links 
Biography at the Dictionary of Canadian Biography Online

1794 births
1849 deaths
Anglophone Quebec people
English emigrants to pre-Confederation Quebec
Canadian male journalists
Canadian male non-fiction writers
Canadian publishers (people)
Canadian non-fiction writers
Journalists from Quebec
People from Carlisle, Cumbria
Writers from Quebec
Immigrants to Lower Canada